The Washington Pavilion of Arts and Science opened in 1999 and houses an art gallery, concert hall, large-format theater, and science museum in Sioux Falls, South Dakota, United States.  Its building, the former Washington High School, is listed on the National Register of Historic Places.

History

The Pavilion was a result of a renovation of the former building of Washington High School which was eventually moved to the northeast side of the city. The building is of Neoclassical styling and is architecturally interesting. It was designed by Sioux Falls architect Joseph Schwartz. The building's facade is created from large blocks of Sioux Quartzite, a pinkish quartzite native to the area and seen at the falls of the Big Sioux River. A small portion of the north wing is constructed of black rock which was believed to be black quartzite but is in fact corson diabase, which is hardened liquid magma.

It was listed on the National Register of Historic Places in 1986.

Contents
The Washington Pavilion of Arts and Science contains the Kirby Science Discovery Center, a massive 3 floor, regional, hands-on science experience.

The Pavilion also houses two performing arts centers, which play host to several Broadway productions, operas, dance and concert productions. The South Dakota Symphony's home also hosts dance groups as well as smaller theater and choral events.

The Visual Arts Center, hosts seven galleries of changing exhibits, and the Egger gallery which hosts the Northern Plains Tribal Art collection. The VAC hosts a variety local, regional and nationwide exhibitions, as well as Blockbuster exhibitions like Rodin, Andy Warhol, Ansel Adams and Toulouse-Lautrec. There are also many opportunities to participate in public programs like movies, panel discussions, art workshops, major events, etc. The VAC is free on Tuesdays, Saturday Mornings and the evenings of the First Friday of every month; otherwise there is a small fee.

The Wells Fargo Cinedome is a multiformat 60 ft dome theater which plays several different films per year. Virtually every space within the Pavilion is available for rent for business functions, weddings, receptions and conventions.

References

External links
 
Pavilion website

1999 establishments in South Dakota
Science museums in South Dakota
Art museums and galleries in South Dakota
Arts centers in South Dakota
Museums in Minnehaha County, South Dakota
Tourist attractions in Sioux Falls, South Dakota
National Register of Historic Places in Sioux Falls, South Dakota
Buildings and structures completed in 1908
School buildings on the National Register of Historic Places in South Dakota